Gümüştarla is a village in the Erzincan District, Erzincan Province, Turkey. The village is populated by Kurds of the Şadiyan tribe and by Turks. It had a population of 1,996 in 2022.

References 

Villages in Erzincan District
Kurdish settlements in Erzincan Province